Henry Wilson (31 March 1865 – 18 August 1914) was an Australian cricketer. He played six first-class matches for Tasmania between 1889 and 1901.

See also
 List of Tasmanian representative cricketers

References

External links
 

1865 births
1914 deaths
Australian cricketers
Tasmania cricketers
Cricketers from Tasmania
People from Westbury, Tasmania